Deniliquin is a town in the Riverina region of New South Wales, Australia, close to the border with Victoria. It is the largest town in the Edward River Council local government area.

The town is divided in two parts by the Edward River, an anabranch of the Murray River, with the main business district located on the south bank.

The town services a productive agricultural district with prominent rice, wool and timber industries.

History
Prior to European settlement, the Aboriginal inhabitants of the Deniliquin area were the Barababaraba people.

In 1843, the entrepreneur and speculator Benjamin Boyd acquired land in the vicinity of present-day Deniliquin (probably via his agent Augustus Morris). The location was known as The Sandhills, but Boyd (or Morris) named it Deniliquin after 'Denilakoon', a local Aborigine famed for his wrestling prowess. An inn and a punt were established on the site between 1845 and 1847; the town site was surveyed in 1848, and gazetted in 1850. The original Native Police force of Frederick Walker was organised at Deniliquin in 1848. Deniliquin Post Office opened on 1 January 1850.

In 1853, William John Wills of the Burke and Wills expedition worked as a shepherd at the Royal Bank sheep station near Deniliquin.

As Deniliquin was established on the convergence of major stock routes between the colonies of Queensland, New South Wales and the Victorian gold rush centres of Victoria, it soon became an important river crossing and the first bridge was built over the Edward River in 1861. The Deniliquin and Moama Railway Company built a private railway in 1879 to connect with Moama, across the Murray River from the busy river port of Echuca, connected by rail to Melbourne.

Wool growing quickly became a major industry and the area around Deniliquin was home to several Merino studs. In 1861, George Hall Peppin and his two sons, experienced English sheep breeders, established a Merino stud at Wanganella station, north of Deniliquin. There, the brothers developed the Peppin Merino, able to thrive in drier inland regions. Today, as many as 70 per cent of Merinos in Australia are said to be directly descended from these sheep.

In the 1860s, Deniliquin was the centre of a short-lived campaign by wealthy pastoralists including Peppin, George Desailly, Robert Landale and William Brodribb for secession from New South Wales and the creation of a new Riverina colony. This campaign was supported by David Jones, proprietor of the local newspaper, the Pastoral Times.

On 19 December 1868, Deniliquin was constituted as the Municipality of Deniliquin, and the first municipal election was held on 23 February 1869. In 1993, the enactment of the Local Government Act (NSW) saw the name of the council changed from the Municipality of Deniliquin to the Deniliquin Council.

Large-scale irrigation schemes came to the Deniliquin area with the establishment of the Deniboota and Denimein Irrigation Districts in 1938 and the Berriquin Irrigation District in 1939, using water diverted from the Murray River at Lake Mulwala through the Mulwala Canal. An ample and reliable water supply led to the development of water-intensive industries such as rice growing.

During the Second World War, RAAF Station Deniliquin was home to No. 7 Service Flying Training School RAAF. It was also a final disbanding site for squadrons returning from active duty against the Japanese in the Pacific. No. 22 Squadron RAAF and No. 30 Squadron RAAF were disbanded here in 1946, and in 1945 and 1946 it was also a base for No. 78 Squadron RAAF before it was finally disbanded in Williamtown.

Also during World War II, Muswellbrook was the location of RAAF No.15 Inland Aircraft Fuel Depot (IAFD), completed in 1942 and closed on 29 August 1944. Usually consisting of 4 tanks, 31 fuel depots were built across Australia for the storage and supply of aircraft fuel for the RAAF and the US Army Air Forces at a total cost of £900,000 ($1,800,000).

In April 2006, the Herald Sun reported on its front cover that the Edward River was dry, with an accompanying photograph showing a dry creek. This was later revealed to be erroneous; the photograph was of an unknown channel on a farm within  of Deniliquin, while the Edward River was in fact still running. Deniliquin Council and members of the Deniliquin community have since attempted to rectify the damage to local tourism by improving the profile of Deniliquin in various media outlets.

Heritage listings
Deniliquin has a number of heritage-listed sites, including:
 Cressy Street (South): Old St Paul's Anglican Church
 Cressy Street: Waring Gardens
 72 End Street: Deniliquin 12 Pounder Rifled Breech-Loading Gun
 72 End Street: Deniliquin 75mm Field Gun
 George Street: Deniliquin Public School and School Master's Residence
 Poictiers Street: St Andrew's Uniting Church

Population
According to the 2016 census of Population, there were 7,862 people in Deniliquin, including the surrounding rural area.
 Aboriginal and Torres Strait Islander people made up 4.5% of the population. 
 82.3% of people were born in Australia. The next most common country of birth was England at 1.4%.   
 87.5% of people spoke only English at home. 
 The most common responses for religion were No Religion 27.6%, Catholic 24.6% and Anglican 17.7%.

Industry

Deniliquin is a service centre for the surrounding agricultural region. The region includes both dryland and irrigated areas. The dryland areas support grazing, in particular beef cattle and wool growing. Deniliquin is home to many famous Merino studs and the saltbush plains produce quality medium class wool.

The irrigated areas produce a range of high-yield crops. Rice was a major crop until the recent drought. The largest rice mill in the southern hemisphere is in Deniliquin, producing large packs and bulk rice for export markets. The rice mill closed in December 2007 and will reopen in April 2011.

Deniliquin is also the headquarters of Murray Irrigation Limited, an irrigator owned private company and one of the largest privately owned irrigation supply companies in the world. Murray Irrigation manages the operations of the Berriquin, Deniboota, Denimein and Wakool Irrigation Areas in the Murray Valley. These areas produce 50% of Australia's rice crop, 20% of NSW milk production, 75% of NSW processing tomatoes and 40% of NSW potatoes.

Sawmills in the area process timber harvested from the River red gum forests lining the Edward and Murray floodplains.

As the largest town in the south western Riverina, there is a range of government and commercial services to residents of the town and the surrounding area.

Climate
Deniliquin has a semi-arid climate with hot, dry summers and cool winters.

Notable people
Notable people from, or who have lived in, the Deniliquin area include:
 Adam Alexander Armstrong , former Member for Riverina, official Victoria Racing Club starter (21 Melbourne Cups), Military Cross awarded WW 2 for bravery in New Guinea
 Leo Barry, an Australian rules football player with Sydney Swans 
 Eileen Mary Casey (1881–1972), suffragette
Michael Cavanagh, drummer for Australian psychedelic rock band King Gizzard and The Lizard Wizard
 Aileen Dent (1890–1978), artist
 Malcolm Fraser, a former Liberal Prime Minister
 Adam Gilchrist, test and one day cricket wicket keeper and sports commentator
 Roy Higgins, Melbourne Cup winning jockey 
 Patrick Jennings, a former Premier of New South Wales
 Sam Lloyd, an Australian rules football player with Richmond Tigers 
 Todd Marshall, an Australian rules football player with Port Adelaide Power  
 Peter McIntyre, an Australian rules football player with Adelaide Crows 
 Eric Moore, drummer and manager for Australian psychedelic rock band King Gizzard and The Lizard Wizard
 Lee Naimo, Axis of Awesome guitarist 
 Simon O'Donnell, test and one day cricket player, Australian rules football player and media personality

Education
Deniliquin has three public primary schools (Deniliquin South, Deniliquin North and Edward), one Catholic primary school (St Michael's primary school), one public high school (Deniliquin High School) and one independent K-10 school (Deniliquin Christian School)

It has a TAFE NSW Campus, which is part of the Riverina Institute of TAFE.

Deniliquin is also the base for the NSW Department of Education South West Riverina regional office. South West Music Regional Conservatorium, part of a network of regional Conservatoriums in NSW, also offers a range of music tuition.

Sport
Sporting clubs in the area include:
Australian rules football
 Deniliquin Rams Football Club, have competed in the Murray Football League since 1933.
 Deniliquin Rovers Football Club competing in the Picola & District Football League.

The Deniliquin Football Association ran from 1900 to 1932.

Rugby union football
 Deniliquin Drovers, competing in the Victorian Rugby Union Country Division
Cricket
 Deniliquin Rhinos Cricket Team, competing in the Murray Valley Cricket Association
Soccer
Deniliquin Wanderers Soccer Club
Formed in the 1960s. Currently playing in the Griffith and District Football Association

Deni Play on the Plains Festival

Deniliquin is home to the Play on the Plains Festival, held each September/October on the New South Wales Labour Day long weekend. The festival includes the well-known Deniliquin Ute Muster. The Deni Play on the Plains Festival has set a number of world records, including the following:

Music

Deniliquin has had many local bands, some notable ones being the Lincolns, the Stormtroopers and the Lexies. Attempts been made to encourage other bands to come to Deniliquin to perform, with varying success. Solo performers who came from Deniliquin include Shane McGrath, Michael Gorham and Joel Sulman, with local artists often showcased at the Deniliquin Ute Muster.

Music festivals
Deniliquin has been home to many music festivals. These include:

Deniliquin Blues and Roots Festival: Held over the Easter long weekend and has bought acts such as Status Quo, Santana, Jason Mraz (2013) and held in 2014 John Mayer, Elvis Costello, local artist Michael Gorham and previous local blues artist Joel Sulman. It won Best Inland Festival in 2013.
The Flat Earth Festival, organised by a youth committee under the auspices of South West Music, beginning in 1999 and running until 2003. The aim of the Flat Earth Festival (so named because Deniliquin is on the Hay Plains, the area with the smallest deviation of elevation on Earth) was to provide a music festival accompanied by other activities (such as motorcross demonstrations) in a drug- and alcohol-free environment. The Flat Earth Festival youth committee failed to attract new members as previous members moved on, and the event recessed. Bands attending the Flat Earth Festival included Grinspoon and Sunk Loto.
Shakedown Festival, which involves live bands and DJs. It is organised by the Deniliquin Youth Council, a sub-committee of the Deniliquin Municipal Council, and is held during National Youth Week, on 14 April. Notable acts appearing at Shakedown include Dukes of Windsor, Behind Crimson Eyes and Andy Van.
Spring Blues Festival, inaugurated in 2006. The aim of the festival is to expose Deniliquin residents to talented blues musicians performing in Australia, as well as providing music workshops and impromptu jam sessions. Notable acts appearing at The Spring Blues Festival have included Dutch Tilders and Jeff Lang.

Media
The local newspaper is the Deniliquin Pastoral Times. It is published on Tuesdays and Fridays and – on each of these days – has a circulation of 2787, with an estimated readership of 10,260. Other newspapers circulated throughout the Deniliquin region include the Herald Sun, The Age, The Sydney Morning Herald and The Daily Telegraph.

There are three local radio stations: 102.5 Edge FM, 1521 2QN (classic hits) and 106.1FM (country music narrowcast), while ABC Local Radio's ABC Riverina service (broadcast from Wagga Wagga) is available on AM675.  Other stations broadcasting throughout the region include Radio National, SBS Radio and Sky Sports Radio.

Locally available TV stations include ABC Television (ABC TV, ABC TV Plus, ABC Me and ABC News), SBS Television (SBS TV, SBS Viceland, SBS Food, NITV, SBS WorldWatch, SBS World Movies), Prime7 (Prime7 HD, 7Two, 7mate, 7flix and Racing.com), WIN Television (WIN HD, 9Go!, 9Gem, TVSN, WIN Gold and 9Life) and Southern Cross 10 (10 HD, 10 Peach, 10 Bold, 10 Shake, SBN and Sky News Regional). WIN Television produces a half-hour-long regional news bulletin which screens from Monday to Friday at 6pm.

The thriller The Clinic was filmed in Deniliquin in 2008. The producers used many locations in the town while shooting, including the Peppin Motor Inn, Warbreccan Homestead, Deniliquin abattoirs and the largest rice mill in the Southern Hemisphere.

References

External links

Series of Images of Deniliquin, New South Wales, 1994 – National Library of Australia
Deniliquin Play On The Plain Festival
Deniliquin Pastoral Times
Deniliquin Businesses

 
Towns in the Riverina
Towns in New South Wales